Punturin is one of the 33 barangays that comprises the City of Valenzuela, Philippines. It is a mix of industrial and residential areas like its neighboring barangays of Bignay and Lawang Bato.

History 
In the early times, Punturin was a pure, virgin forest with hills surrounding its vast landscape. Creeks enclosed some of the areas which are directly connected to the Meycauayan River.

The name of the place originated from the word “Maraming Puntod” which means an abundance of hills because of its enveloping terrain.

With the onset of civilization, the people decide to clear the wilderness for more agricultural lands to till. Wood materials gathered from the forest were used in setting up their homes. Fishing was also a primary means of livelihood because of the abundant aquatic resources from the river.

Punturin was used to be a part of Barrio Lawang Bato but as the number of residents increased, it was decided by the old inhabitants to separate the northern part of the area. The barangay was officially established on April 4, 1945 under Mayor Avelino Deato.

Today, Punturin is well known for its industrial areas and its fast-growing population due to different residential areas established within the barangay.

They celebrate fiesta every first day of May, the feast of St. Joseph the Worker. Famous delicacies include kuchinta, bibingka, puto or sweet rice desserts. An estimated 20,930 residents live in Punturin in this 162.20 square hectare barangay.

Education
Elementary and high school education is accessible for the residents of Punturin. It has two public elementary school and one public high school under the Division of City Schools of Valenzuela. Vicente P. Trinidad National High School, named after the former Brgy. Capt. Vicente Trinidad, is a public high school that serves not only the residents of Punturin, but also its neighboring barangays. Senior high school education is also offered in VPTNHS, but the first senior high school institution in Punturin was in St. Gregory College of Valenzuela. Punturin had also numerous day care centers managed by the City Social Welfare and Development Office.

Public schools 
 Vicente P. Trinidad National High School
 Punturin Elementary School
 Punturin 1 Elementary School
 Punturin Senior High School

Private schools 
 St. Gregory College of Valenzuela
 Our Lord's Vineyard School
 St. Benedict Academy of Valenzuela
 Grace Pearl School of Valenzuela
 St. Joseph School of Lawang Bato,

Residential areas 
 Sta. Lucia Village Phases III, IV, V, and VI
 Green Meadows
 Natividad Homes
 Northville 1B

Religion 
Majority of the residents of the barangay are Roman Catholics. The patron saint of Punturin is St. Joseph the Worker with its feast day celebrated every May 1. Other religions that established churches within Punturin are Iglesia ni Cristo and Members Church of God International among others.

Famous landmarks

Government 
 3S Center Punturin (Barangay Hall of Punturin)
 Fire station
 Police station
 Playground
 Various social services
 Vicente P. Trinidad National High School
 Punturin Senior High School (under construction)
 Punturin Elementary School
 Punturin 1 Elementary School

Places of worship 
 St. Joseph Parish Church
 Iglesia Ni Cristo (Lokal ng Punturin)
 Ang Dating Daan

Commercial centers 
 7 Eleven Punturin
 Punturin Wet and Dry Market

Transport terminals 
 CALAPUPA TODA Terminal (Canumay East, Lawang Bato, Punturin, Paso de Blas)
 BP TODA Terminal (Bignay, Punturin)
 Meycauayan-Punturin Jeepney Terminal

Others 
 WL Foods
 Motorstar

References

Barangays of Metro Manila
Valenzuela, Metro Manila